Arasada pyraliformis is a moth of the family Noctuidae first described by Frederic Moore in 1884. It is found in Sri Lanka, Taiwan and Thailand.

References

Moths of Asia
Moths described in 1884
Acontiinae